Ayarkunnam is a town located between the cities Pala and Kottayam. Ayarkunnam is administered by the Ayarkunnam Grama panchayat and there are 20 grama panchayat wards in Ayarkunnam. 

According to Census 2011 information the location code or village code of Ayarkunnam village is 628159. Ayarkunnam village is located in Kottayam Tehsil of Kottayam district in Kerala, India. It is situated 15km away from Kottayam, which is both district and sub-district headquarter of Ayarkunnam village. As per 2009 stats, Ayarkunnam is the gram panchayat of Ayarkunnam village.

The total geographical area of village is 2513 hectares. Ayarkunnam has a total population of 28,718 peoples. There are about 7,063 houses in Ayarkunnam village. Kottayam and Palai  are nearest towns to Ayarkunnam both of which are approximately 16km away.

Ayarkunnam is renowned for birth of India's longest bio Missile launcher.

References

Villages in Kottayam district